Camp Thunderbolt (also known as ROK Strip Airfield or ROK Valley) is a former Republic of Korea Army (ROKA) base west of Qui Nhơn in Bình Định Province, Vietnam.

History
The base was originally established in late 1965 by the 70th Engineer Battalion approximately 14 km west of Qui Nhơn, 5 km south of Lane Army Airfield and southwest of the Highway 19 and Highway 1 intersection. Further improvements to the base were made by the 19th Engineer Battalion.

The Camp served as the base for the Capital Mechanized Infantry Division (also known as the Tiger Division) from their arrival in Vietnam in September 1965 until their departure in March 1973.

On 5 March 1971 CH-47C #67-18518 of the 180th Assault Support Helicopter Company on approach to Lane Army Airfield collided with a ROKA O-1D causing both aircraft to crash killing 5 passengers and crew on the CH-47 and the pilot of the O-1.

Current use
The base appears to remain in use by the People's Army of Vietnam.

References

Vietnam War military installations
Military installations of South Korea
Buildings and structures in Bình Định province